Pacific Overtures is a musical with music and lyrics by Stephen Sondheim, and a book by John Weidman, with "additional material by" Hugh Wheeler.

Set in 19th-century Japan, it tells the story of the country's westernization starting in 1853, when American ships forcibly opened it to the rest of the world. The story is told from the point of view of the Japanese, and focuses in particular on the lives of two friends who are caught in the change.

Sondheim wrote the score in a quasi-Japanese style of parallel 4ths and no leading-tone. He did not use the pentatonic scale; the 4th degree of the major scale is represented from the opening number through the finale, as Sondheim found just five pitches too limiting. The music contrasts Japanese contemplation ("There Is No Other Way") with Western ingenuousness ("Please Hello") while over the course of the 127 years, Western harmonies, tonality and even lyrics are infused into the score. The score is generally considered to be one of Sondheim's most ambitious and sophisticated efforts.

The original Broadway production of Pacific Overtures in 1976 was staged in Kabuki style, with men playing women's parts and set changes made in full view of the audience by black-clad stagehands. It opened to mixed reviews and closed after six months, despite being nominated for ten Tony Awards.

Given its specific casting and production demands, Pacific Overtures remains one of Stephen Sondheim's least-performed musicals. The show is occasionally staged by opera companies. The cast requires an abundance of male Asian actors who must play male and female parts. As written, women join the ensemble for only half of the last song; all other principal female roles are played by men, as was traditional in Kabuki theatre. In the original production the five female cast members appeared throughout the show in small roles and as stagehands, and more recent productions, including the 2004 Broadway revival, did away with the device of men playing the majority of the women's roles. 

The most recent revival in 2017 at Classic Stage Company, helmed by John Doyle and starring George Takei as The Reciter, featured a cast of only 10 people, 8 men and 2 women. This also featured a revised book by John Weidman that had a running time of 90 minutes (as compared to the previous 2 hour 30 minute original run time).

Title

The title of the work is drawn directly from text in a letter from Admiral Perry addressed to the Emperor dated July 7, 1853:

"Many of the large ships-of-war destined to visit Japan have not yet arrived in these seas, though they are hourly expected; and the undersigned, as an evidence of his friendly intentions, has brought but four of the smaller ones, designing, should it become necessary, to return to Edo in the ensuing spring with a much larger force.  But it is expected that the government of your imperial majesty will render such return unnecessary, by acceding at once to the very reasonable and pacific overtures contained in the President's letter, and which will be further explained by the undersigned on the first fitting occasion."

In addition to playing on the musical term "overture" and the geographical reference to the Pacific Ocean there is also the irony, revealed as the story unfolds, that these "pacific overtures" to initiate commercial exploitation of the Pacific nation were backed by a none too subtle threat of force.

Productions
Pacific Overtures previewed in Boston and ran at The Kennedy Center for a month before opening on Broadway at the Winter Garden Theatre on January 11, 1976. It closed after 193 performances on June 27, 1976. Directed by Harold Prince, the choreography was by Patricia Birch, scenic design by Boris Aronson, costume design by Florence Klotz, and lighting design by Tharon Musser. The original cast recording was released originally by RCA Records and later on CD. This production was nominated for 10 Tony Awards, and won Best Scenic Design (Boris Aronson) and Best Costume Design (Florence Klotz). The original Broadway production was filmed and broadcast on Japanese television in 1976.

An off-Broadway production ran at the Promenade Theatre from October 25, 1984 for 109 performances, transferring from an earlier production at the York Theatre Company. Directed by Fran Soeder with choreography by Janet Watson, the cast featured Ernest Abuba and Kevin Gray.

The European premiere was directed by Howard Lloyd-Lewis (Library Theatre, Manchester) at Wythenshawe Forum in 1986 with choreography by Paul Kerryson who subsequently directed the show in 1993 at Leicester Haymarket Theatre. Both productions featured Mitch Sebastian in the role of Commodore Perry.

A production was mounted in London by the English National Opera in 1987. The production was recorded in its entirety on CD, preserving nearly the entire libretto as well as the score. Unlike previous productions, this production featured a cast consisting primarily of Caucasian actors and opera singers.

A critically acclaimed 2001 Chicago Shakespeare Theater production, directed by Gary Griffin, transferred to the West End Donmar Warehouse, where it ran from June 30, 2003 until September 6, 2003 and received the 2004 Olivier Award for Outstanding Musical Production.

In 2002 the New National Theatre of Tokyo presented two limited engagements of their production, which was performed in Japanese with English supertitles. The production ran at Avery Fisher Hall, Lincoln Center from July 9, 2002 through July 13, and then at the Eisenhower Theater, Kennedy Center, from September 3, 2002, through September 8.

A Broadway revival by the Roundabout Theatre Company (an English-language mounting of the previous New National Theatre of Tokyo production) ran at Studio 54 from December 2, 2004, to January 30, 2005, directed by Amon Miyamoto and starring BD Wong as the Narrator and several members of the original cast. A new Broadway recording, with new (reduced) orchestrations by Jonathan Tunick was released by PS Classics, with additional material not included on the original cast album. The production was nominated for four Tony Awards, including Best Revival of a Musical. The orchestrations were "scaled back" for a 7-piece orchestra. Variety noted that "the heavy use of traditional lutes and percussion instruments like wood blocks, chimes and drums showcases the craftsmanship behind this distinctly Japanese-flavored score."

In 2017, Classic Stage Company revived Pacific Overtures for a limited run Off-Broadway, with a new abridged book by John Weidman and new orchestrations by Jonathan Tunick. This production was directed by current Artistic Director John Doyle and starred George Takei as the Reciter. It began previews on April 6, 2017 and opened on May 4, 2017. Originally scheduled to close on May 27, it was extended twice, and closed on June 18, 2017. This production was a New York Times Critic's Pick, Varietys 2017 Top 5 NY Theater Production, and Hollywood Reporters 2017 Top 10 NY Theater Production. It also received numerous nominations from the Drama Desk, Drama League, Outer Critics Circle, and Lucille Lortel Awards. This version ran as a 90-minute one-act with a 10-member cast in modern-dress and included all the songs from the original production except for "Chrysanthemum Tea" and eliminated the instrumental/dance number "Lion Dance".

Plot summary
Act I

Conceived as a Japanese playwright's version of an American musical about American influences on Japan, Pacific Overtures opens in July 1853. Since the foreigners were expelled from the island empire, explains the Reciter, elsewhere wars are fought and machines are rumbling, but in Nippon they plant rice, exchange bows and enjoy peace and serenity, and there has been nothing to threaten the changeless cycle of their days ("The Advantages of Floating in the Middle of the Sea"). But President Millard Fillmore, determined to open up trade with Japan, has sent Commodore Matthew C. Perry across the Pacific.

To the consternation of Lord Abe and the Shogun's other Councillors, the stirrings of trouble begin with the appearance of Manjiro, a fisherman who had been lost at sea and rescued by Americans. He has returned to Japan and now attempts to warn the authorities of the approaching warships, but is instead arrested for consorting with foreigners. A minor samurai, Kayama Yezaemon, is appointed Prefect of  Police at Uraga to drive the Americans away - news which leaves his wife Tamate grief-stricken, since Kayama will certainly fail and both will then have to commit seppuku. As he leaves, she expresses her feelings in dance as two Observers describe the scene and sing her thoughts and words ("There Is No Other Way"). As a Fisherman, a Thief, and other locals relate the sight of the "Four Black Dragons" roaring through the sea, an extravagant Oriental caricature of the USS Powhatan pulls into harbor. Kayama is sent to meet with the Americans but he is laughed at and rejected as not being important enough. He enlists the aid of Manjiro, the only man in Japan who has dealt with Americans, and disguised as a great lord, Manjiro is able to get an answer from them: Commodore Perry must meet the Shogun within six days or else he will shell the city. Facing this ultimatum, the Shogun refuses to commit himself to an answer and takes to his bed. Exasperated by his indecision and procrastination, his Mother, with elaborate courtesy, poisons him. ("Chrysanthemum Tea").

Kayama devises a plan by which the Americans can be received without technically setting foot on Japanese soil, thanks to a covering of tatami mats and a raised Treaty House, for which he is made Governor of Uraga. He and Manjiro set off for Uraga, forging a bond of friendship through the exchange of "Poems". Kayama has saved Japan, but it is too late to save Tamate: when Kayama arrives at his home, he finds that she is dead, having committed seppuku after having received no news of Kayama for many days. Already events are moving beyond the control of the old order: the two men pass a Madam instructing her inexperienced Oiran girls in the art of seduction as they prepare for the arrival of the foreign devils ("Welcome to Kanagawa").

Commodore Perry and his men disembark and, on their "March to the Treaty House", demonstrate their goodwill by offering such gifts as two bags of Irish potatoes and a copy of Owen's "Geology of Minnesota". The negotiations themselves are observed through the memories of three who were there: a warrior hidden beneath the floor of the Treaty House who could hear the debates, a young boy who could see the action from his perch in the tree outside, and the boy as an old man recalling that without "Someone In a Tree", a silent watcher, history is incomplete. Initially, it seems as if Kayama has won; the Americans depart in peace. But the barbarian figure of Commodore Perry leaps out to perform a traditional Kabuki "Lion Dance", which ends as a strutting, triumphalist, all-American cakewalk.

Act II

The child emperor (portrayed by a puppet manipulated by his advisors) reacts with pleasure to the departure of the Americans, promoting Lord Abe to Shogun, confirming Kayama as Governor of Uraga and raising Manjiro to the rank of Samurai. The crisis appears to have passed, but to the displeasure of Lord Abe the Americans return to request formal trading arrangements. To the tune of a Sousa march, an American ambassador bids "Please Hello" to Japan and is followed by a Gilbertian British ambassador, a clog-dancing Dutchman, a gloomy Russian and a dandified Frenchman all vying for access to Japan's markets. With the appearance of this new group of westerners, the faction of the Lords of the South grow restless. They send a politically charged gift to the Emperor, a storyteller who tells a vivid, allegorical tale of a brave young emperor who frees himself from his cowardly Shogun.

Fifteen years pass as Kayama and Manjiro dress themselves for tea. As Manjiro continues to dress in traditional robes for the tea ceremony, Kayama gradually adopts the manners, culture and dress of the newcomers, proudly displaying a new pocket watch, cutaway coat and "A Bowler Hat". Although Kayama, as stated in his reports to the Shogun, manages to reach an "understanding" with the Western merchants and diplomats, tensions abound between the Japanese and the "barbarians". Three British sailors on shore leave mistake the daughter of a samurai for a geisha ("Pretty Lady"). Though their approach is initially gentle, they grow more persistent to the point where they offer her money; the girl cries for help and her father kills one of the confused sailors. Kayama and Abe travel to the Emperor's court discussing the situation. While on the road, their party is attacked by cloaked assassins sent by the Lords of the South and Abe is assassinated. Kayama is horrified to discover that one of the assassins is his former friend, Manjiro; they fight and Kayama is killed.

In the ensuing turmoil, the puppet Emperor seizes real power and vows that Japan will modernize itself. As the country moves from one innovation to the "Next!", the Imperial robes are removed layer by layer to show the Reciter in modern dress. Contemporary Japan - the country of Toyota, Seiko, air and water pollution and market domination - assembles itself around him and its accomplishments are extolled. "Nippon. The Floating Kingdom. There was a time when foreigners were not welcome here. But that was long ago..." says the Reciter. "Welcome to Japan."

Original Broadway cast — characters 
 Mako — Reciter, Shogun, Jonathan Goble, Emperor Meiji
 Soon-Tek Oh — Tamate, Samurai, Storyteller, Swordsman
 Isao Sato — Kayama
 Yuki Shimoda — Lord Abe
 Sab Shimono — Manjiro
 Ernest Abuba — Samurai, Adams, Noble
 James Dybas — Councillor, Old Man, French Admiral
 Timm Fujii — Son, Priest, Kanagawa Girl, Noble, British Sailor
 Haruki Fujimoto — Servant,  Commodore Matthew Calbraith Perry
 Larry Hama — Williams, Lord of the South, Gangster
 Ernest Harada — Physician, Madam, British Admiral
 Alvin Ing — Shogun's Mother, Observer, Merchant, American Admiral
 Patrick Kinser-Lau — Shogun's Companion, Kanagawa Girl, Dutch Admiral, British Sailor
 Jae Woo Lee — Fisherman, Sumo Wrestler, Lord of the South
 Freddy Mao — Councillor, Samurai's Daughter
 Tom Matsusaka — Imperial Priest
 Freda Foh Shen — Shogun's Wife
 Mark Hsu Syers — Samurai, Thief, Soothsayer, Warrior, Russian Admiral, British Sailor
 Ricardo Tobia — Observer
 Gedde Watanabe — Priest, Kanagawa Girl, The Boy
 Conrad Yama — Grandmother, Sumo Wrestler, Japanese Merchant
 Fusako Yoshida — Shamisen accompaniment

Proscenium Servants, Sailors and Townspeople: Kenneth S. Eiland, Timm Fujii, Joey Ginza, Patrick Kinser-Lau, Diane Lam, Tony Marinyo, Kevin Maung, Kim Miyori, Dingo Secretario, Freda Foh Shen, Mark Hsu Seyers, Gedde Watanabe, Leslie Watanabe, Ricardo Tobia

1984 Off-Broadway revival  cast — characters 
 Ernest Abuba — Reciter
 Tony Marino — Lord Abe, Second Officer
 Thomas Ikeda — Third Councillor, Merchant's Mother, Physician, Madam, Russian Admiral
 Chuck Brown — Shogun's Mother, Old Samurai With Mask, British Admiral
 Tom Matsusaka — Second Councillor, Imperial Priest, Fencing Master
 Kevin Gray — Kayama Yesaemon
 Timm Fujii — Tamate, Shogun's Wife, British Sailor
 John Baray — Observer/Sumo Wrestler/Old Man/American Admiral
 Tim Ewing — Observer, Thief, Shogun's Companion
 John Caleb — Fisherman, John Manjiro, French Admiral
 Ronald Yamamoto — Merchant, First Officer, Sumo Wrestler, Kanagawa Girl
 John Bantay — Merchant's Son, Commodore Perry, Kanagawa Girl
 Ray Contreras — Soothsayer, Warrior, British Sailor
 Allen Tung — Priest, Kanagawa Girl, Fencing Master's Daughter
 Francis Jue — Priest, Kanagawa Girl, Boy, Dutch Admiral, British Sailor

Proscenium Servants: Gerri Igarashi, Gayln Kong, Diane Lam, Christine Toy

2004 Broadway revival cast — characters 
 BD Wong - Reciter
 Evan D'Angeles - Observer, Warrior, Officer, British Admiral
 Joseph Anthony Foronda -  Thief, Soothsayer, Samurai, Storyteller
 Yoko Fumoto - Tamate
 Alvin Ing - Shogun's Mother, Old Man
 Fred Isozaki - Noble
 Francis Jue - Madam, Dutch Admiral
 Darren Lee - American Admiral, Sailor, Officer
 Hoon Lee - Sailor, Merchant, Commodore Matthew Calbraith Perry, Lord of the South
 Michael K. Lee - Kayama
 Ming Lee - Councilor, Priest, Emperor Priest
 Telly Leung - Boy, Observer, Sailor, Shogun's Companion, Noble
 Paolo Montalban - Manjiro
 Alan Muraoka - Councilor, Grandmother (Muraoka also understudied the Dutch Admiral and performs the role in the 2004 cast recording)
 Mayumi Omagari - Kanagawa Girl, Daughter
 Daniel Jay Park - Priest, Kanagawa Girl, French Admiral
 Hazel Anne Raymundo - Shogun's Wife, Kanagawa Girl
 Sab Shimono - Lord Abe
 Yuka Takara - Son, Shogun's Wife's Servant, Kanagawa Girl
 Scott Watanabe - Fisherman, Russian Admiral, Older Swordsman, Physician, Samurai Bodyguard

2017 Off-Broadway revival cast — characters 
 George Takei - Reciter
 Karl Josef Co - Fisherman, American Admiral, First Sailor
 Steven Eng -  Kayama
 Megan Masako Haley - Tamate
 Ann Harada - Madam, French Admiral
 Austin Ku - Boy, British Admiral, Third Sailor
 Kelvin Moon Loh - Warrior, Russian Admiral, Second Sailor
 Orville Mendoza - Manjiro
 Marc Oka - Thief, Dutch Admiral
 Thom Sesma - Lord Abe, Old Man

Musical numbers

Act One
Prologue — Orchestra
The Advantages of Floating in the Middle of the Sea — Reciter and Company
There Is No Other Way — Tamate, Observers
Four Black Dragons — Fisherman, Thief, Reciter, Townspeople
Chrysanthemum Tea — Shogun, Shogun's Mother, Shogun's Wife, Soothsayer, Priests, Shogun's Companion, Physician, Sumo Wrestlers
Poems — Kayama, Manjiro
Welcome to Kanagawa — Madam and Girls
March to the Treaty House — Orchestra
Someone in a Tree — Old Man, Reciter, Boy, Warrior
Lion Dance — Commodore Perry

Act Two
Please Hello — Abe, Reciter, American, British, Dutch, Russian and French Admirals
A Bowler Hat — Kayama
Pretty Lady — Three British Sailors
Next — Reciter and Company

Critical response and analysis
"Someone in a Tree", where two witnesses describe negotiations between the Japanese and Americans, was Sondheim's favorite song out of everything he had written.  "A Bowler Hat" presents the show's theme, as a samurai gradually becomes more Westernized as he progressively adopts the habits and affectations of the foreigners he is meant to supervise. “Pretty Lady” is a contrapuntal trio of three British sailors who have mistaken a young girl for a geisha and are attempting to woo her. This is, perhaps, the musical fusion highlight of the show as the orchestra and lays descending parallel 4ths and the singers use a counterpoint form established during the Western Renaissance; again the chord progression is often IV to I, again eschewing Pentatonics.

The New York Times review of the original 1976 production said "The lyrics are totally Western and—as is the custom with Mr. Sondheim—devilish, wittily and delightfully clever. Mr. Sondheim is the most remarkable man in the Broadway musical today—and here he shows it victoriously...Mr. Prince's staging uses all the familiar Kabuki tricks—often with voices screeching in the air like lonely sea birds—and stylizations with screens and things, and stagehands all masked in black to make them invisible to the audience. Like choreography, the direction is designed to meld Kabuki with Western forms...the attempt is so bold and the achievement so fascinating, that its obvious faults demand to be overlooked. It tries to soar—sometimes it only floats, sometimes it actually sinks—but it tries to soar. And the music and lyrics are as pretty and as well-formed as a bonsai tree. "Pacific Overtures" is very, very different."

Walter Kerr's article in The New York Times on the original 1976 production said "But no amount of performing, or of incidental charm, can salvage 'Pacific Overtures.' The occasion is essentially dull and immobile because we are never properly placed in it, drawn neither East nor West, given no specific emotional or cultural bearings." Ruth Mitchell, assistant to Mr. Prince, said in an interview with WPIX that a sense of not belonging was intentional as that was the very point of the show.

Frank Rich, reviewing the 1984 revival for The New York Times stated that "the show attempts an ironic marriage of Broadway and Oriental idioms in its staging, its storytelling techniques and, most of all, in its haunting Stephen Sondheim songs. It's a shotgun marriage, to be sure - with results that are variously sophisticated and simplistic, beautiful and vulgar. But if Pacific Overtures is never going to be anyone's favorite Sondheim musical, it is a far more forceful and enjoyable evening at the Promenade than it was eight years ago at the Winter Garden...Many of the songs are brilliant, self-contained playlets. In Four Black Dragons various peasants describe the arrival of the American ships with escalating panic, until finally the nightmarish event does seem to be, as claimed, the end of the world....Someone in a Tree, is a compact Rashomon - and as fine as anything Mr. Sondheim has written...The single Act II triumph, Bowler Hat, could well be a V. S. Naipaul tale set to music and illustrated with spare Japanese brushstrokes...Bowler Hat delivers the point of Pacific Overtures so artfully that the rest of Act II seems superfluous."

The 2004 production was not as well received. It was based on a critically praised Japanese language production by director Amon Miyamoto. Ben Brantley, reviewing for The New York Times wrote: "Now Mr. Miyamoto and "Pacific Overtures" have returned with an English-speaking, predominantly Asian-American cast, which makes distracting supertitles unnecessary. The show's sets, costumes and governing concept remain more or less the same. Yet unlike the New National Theater of Tokyo production, which was remarkable for its conviction and cohesiveness, this latest incarnation from the Roundabout Theater Company has the bleary, disoriented quality of someone suffering from jet lag after a sleepless trans-Pacific flight. Something has definitely been lost in the retranslation."  Of the cast, Brantley wrote, "Even as they sing sweetly and smile engagingly, they appear to be asking themselves, "What am I doing here?""

Awards and nominations

Original Broadway production

2003 West End Revival

2004 Broadway revival

2017 Off-Broadway revival

See also
 Black ships

Notes

References
Rich, Frank  The Theatre Art of Boris Aronson, 1987, Publisher: Knopf. 
Hirsch, Foster  Harold Prince and the American Musical Theatre, 1989, revised 2005, Publisher: Applause Books, (with Prince providing extensive interviews and the foreword.)
Ilson, Carol,  Harold Prince: From Pajama Game To Phantom of the Opera And Beyond, 1989, published by Cambridge University Press 
Ilson, Carol,  Harold Prince: A Director's Journey, 2000, New York: Limelight Editions

External links
 
 
Pacific Overtures on Sondheim.com
Pacific Overtures on The Stephen Sondheim Reference Guide
Pacific Overtures at the Music Theatre International website
A 1998 Interview with 3 Original Cast members

1976 musicals
Broadway musicals
West End musicals
Original musicals
Laurence Olivier Award-winning musicals
Musicals by Stephen Sondheim
Fiction set in 1853
Japan–United States relations
Japan in fiction
Plays set in Japan
Plays set in the 19th century
Tony Award-winning musicals
Japan in non-Japanese culture